Slovak Canadians are citizens of Canada who were born in Slovakia or who are of full or partial Slovak ancestry. According to the 2016 Canadian census, there were 72,285 Canadians of full or partial Slovak descent.

Notable individuals

See also
Demographics of Slovakia
Canada-Slovakia relations
Slovak people
Slovak Americans

References

External links
Encyclopedia of Canada's Peoples. "Slovaks:Origins.". Multicultural Canada.
The Canadian Encyclopedia. Slovaks. The Historica-Dominion Institute.

European Canadian
 
 
Canada